Lan Marie Nguyen Berg (born 4 March 1987 in Oslo) is a Norwegian politician from the Green Party. She currently serves as an MP for Oslo since 2021 and as one of the party's deputy leaders since 2022. Berg previously served as Oslo City Commissioner for transport and the environment from 2015 to 2021, when she resigned following a confidence vote.

Education 
Berg has a master's degree from the Center for Development and the Environment at the University of Oslo. Berg wrote her master's thesis on the use of solar power in a Kenyan village.

Career 
Berg joined the environmental organisation Spire in 2009, and worked for the Oslo Mela Festival. She was also part of an environmental blog collective called "Grønne jenter" (English: Green Girls), part of a group of ten women who wrote about environmentally conscious fashion, food and lifestyle. Berg was first elected to the Oslo city council in the 2015 Norwegian local elections, after being nominated as the first candidate for the Green Party in Oslo in September 2014.

On 10 October 2022, she was designated first deputy leader of her party, with Arild Hermstad as leader. She was formally elected at the extraordinary congress on 26 November.

Oslo City Commissioner

Following the 2015 local elections, she was appointed city commissioner for transport and the environment in Raymond Johansen’s cabinet.

In the 2019 Norwegian local elections she was again nominated as the Green Party in Oslo's first candidate. She received the most votes of all candidates in the party.

Berg was on parental leave from 2 January to 3 August 2020, and her duties as city commissioner was covered by the party's deputy leader, Arild Hermestad.

In 2020, the Progress Party and the People's Action No to More Road Tolls party submitted a motion of no-confidence against Berg for violations of the Working Environment Act since 2013 and withholding information from the city council. The motion did not pass.

In February 2021, she announced that she intended to create a zero-emissions zone within the city where petrol and diesel cars would be prohibited.

In May, the Oslo Police announced that they would be investigating a number of threats made against her online after she had made a Facebook post expressing solidarity with Gaza during the 2021 Israel–Palestine crisis.

In June, the Oslo City Council passed a motion of no-confidence against her over a controversy concerning the budget of the under construction new water supply for the city. She stayed on in interim capacity until governing mayor Raymond Johansen was given the task to form a new council cabinet. Berg resigned on 18 June and was replaced by Hanna Marcussen in acting capacity. Her permanent successor was Sirin Helvin Stav.

Personal life 
Berg's father, Khanh Thanh Nguyen, moved from Vietnam to Norway as a 13 year old in 1968, after becoming paralyzed after a fall. Her mother, Mari Ann Berg, is a local politician for the Socialist Left Party in Oppegård (now Nordre Follo).

References

External links

Norwegian politicians
University of Oslo alumni
Norwegian people of Vietnamese descent
Green Party (Norway) politicians
1987 births
Living people
Norwegian women in politics